Benjamin Lynde (September 22, 1666 – January 28, 1749) was a lawyer and magistrate of the Province of Massachusetts Bay.  Born in Salem, he was sent to England by his parents, where he read law at the Middle Temple.  He was the first Chief Justice (appointed associate 1712, chief justice 1729) of the Massachusetts Superior Court of Judicature, the province's highest court, to have formal training as a lawyer.  Lynde's family gave its name to the town of Lyndeborough, New Hampshire, established in an area where they had extensive land holdings.  His son Benjamin Jr. also served as a Massachusetts chief justice.

References

 Davis, William. History of the Judiciary of Massachusetts

1666 births
1749 deaths
Justices of the Massachusetts Superior Court of Judicature
People from Salem, Massachusetts
Lyndeborough, New Hampshire